Voron may refer to:

Russian word for the raven
Maurice Voron, French rugby league footballer
Viacheslav Voron (born 1967), Ukrainian singer-songwriter and music producer
Captain M.O. Voron (unknown - about 1776), fictitious Russian pirate 
Tupolev Voron, planned Soviet supersonic unmanned reconnaissance aircraft

See also
 

Surnames from nicknames